Footbridge across a Ditch is an oil painting created in 1883 by Vincent van Gogh.

See also
List of works by Vincent van Gogh

External links

Paintings by Vincent van Gogh
1883 paintings